Hästpojken is a Swedish pop-rock group from Gothenburg. The origin of the name Hästpojken (literally  horseboy in Swedish) remains a mystery.

The band was founded in 2007 and originally consisted of Martin Elisson, vocalist from Bad Cash Quartet, Adam Bolméus, guitarist also from the same band and Lars Malmros (Pop-Lars) drummer from Broder Daniel. This line-up released the band's debut album Caligula in 2008. Elisson and Bolmeus would write most of materials. 2010 saw the follow-up album Från där jag ropar after which Lars Malmros left the band. The band would see many changes in the line-up. The band's third album is En magisk tanke released in 2013. In 2014, Hästpojken played with Göteborgs symfoniker. The band is preparing a new album for release in 2015.

In 2014, Hästpojken was nominated as "best group" during P3 Guld awards.

Members
Martin Elisson — Lead Vocals
Adam Bolméus — Guitar and backing vocals
Oscar Wallblom — Bass and backing vocals
Nico Janco — Drums
Matti Ollikainen — Piano
Karl Ander — Guitar, Keyboard and backing vocals

Former members
Lars Malmros — drums, percussion (2007-2008)
Joel Alme — Bass, backing vocals (2007-2008)
Pontus Tenggren - (????-2010)

Stand-ins during live tours
Stefan Sporsén — Piano
Henrik Lindén — Bass and backing vocals

Discography

Albums

Singles

Others (non-charting)
2007: "Shane MacGowan"
2008: "Caligula"
2008: "Här har du ditt liv"
2010: "Jag e jag"
2012: "Samma himlar"
2013: "Sommarvin"

References

External links
Hästpojken blog page

Swedish rock music groups
Swedish pop music groups